Zucchini is a 1982 children's novel by Barbara Dana and illustrated by Eileen Christelow.  It was followed by a sequel, Zucchini Out West.

Plot summary
The story concerns a young New York boy, Billy, and his pet ferret, Zucchini.  The book contains a number of incorrect basic facts about ferrets, such as claiming that they are herbivorous rodents.

Reception
Kirkus Reviews says "Dana tells the story of Zucchini, ... with low-keyed empathy and with an ear for the inflections of colloquial speech ... that keeps you smiling."

Awards
The book won the 1986 Maud Hart Lovelace Award and the 1986–1987 Land of Enchantment Children's Book Award.

Publishing history

Adaptions
It was adapted into an episode of CBS Storybreak in 1985.

References

1982 American novels
American children's novels
Children's novels about animals
Fictional ferrets
Harper & Row books
1982 children's books
CBS Storybreak